Rudolf Maresch (born 25 November 1934) is a former Austrian cyclist. He competed in three events at the 1956 Summer Olympics.

References

External links
 

1934 births
Living people
Austrian male cyclists
Olympic cyclists of Austria
Cyclists at the 1956 Summer Olympics
Cyclists from Vienna
20th-century Austrian people